The 10th PGA Golden Laurel Awards, honoring the best film and television producers of 1998, were held at The Century Plaza Hotel in Los Angeles, California on March 3, 1999. The nominees were announced on January 19, 1999.

Winners and nominees

Film

Television

Special

PGA Hall of Fame

References

 1998
1998 film awards
1998 television awards